is a prefecture of Japan located in the Chūbu region of Honshū. Fukui Prefecture has a population of 778,943 (1 June 2017) and has a geographic area of 4,190 km2 (1,617 sq mi). Fukui Prefecture borders Ishikawa Prefecture to the north, Gifu Prefecture to the east, Shiga Prefecture to the south, and Kyoto Prefecture to the southwest.

Fukui is the capital and largest city of Fukui Prefecture, with other major cities including Sakai, Echizen, and Sabae. Fukui Prefecture is located on the Sea of Japan coast and is part of the historic Hokuriku region of Japan. The Matsudaira clan, a powerful samurai clan during the Edo period that became a component of the Japanese nobility after the Meiji Restoration, was headquartered at Fukui Castle on the site of the modern prefectural offices. Fukui Prefecture is home to the Kitadani Formation, the Ichijōdani Asakura Family Historic Ruins, and the Tōjinbō cliff range.

Prehistory 
The Kitadani Dinosaur Quarry, on the Sugiyama River within the city limits of Katsuyama, has yielded animals such As Fukuiraptor, Fukuisaurus, Nipponosaurus, Koshisaurus, Fukuivenator, Fukuititan and Tambatitanis  as well as an unnamed dromaeosaurid.

History 

Fukui originally consisted of the old provinces of Wakasa and Echizen, before the prefecture was formed in 1871.

During the Edo period, the daimyō of the region was surnamed Matsudaira, and was a descendant of Tokugawa Ieyasu.

During World War II, Fukui was heavily bombed and its palace, Fukui Castle, surrounded by a moat, was demolished. Buildings for the Fukui Prefectural government were built on the site of the castle.

Geography 
Fukui faces the Sea of Japan, and has a western part (formerly Wakasa) which is a narrow plain between the mountains and the sea, and a larger eastern part (formerly Echizen) with wider plains including the capital and most of the population. The province lies within Japan's "Snow country".

As of 31 March 2008, 15% of the total land area of the prefecture was designated as Natural Parks, namely the Hakusan National Park; Echizen-Kaga Kaigan and Wakasa Wan Quasi-National Parks; and Okuetsu Kōgen Prefectural Natural Park.

Cities

Nine cities are located in Fukui Prefecture:

Towns
These are the towns in each district:

Mergers

Economy 
 Sabae is known for producing 90% of Japan's domestically-made glasses.
 There are several nuclear power plants located along Wakasa Bay in Tsuruga which supply power to the Keihanshin metropolitan region. It has 14 reactors, the most of any prefecture.

Demographics 

Fukui is one of the less populated prefectures of Japan; in September 2015 there were an estimated 785,508 people living in 281,394 households. As seen in most of Japan, Fukui is facing the problem of both an aging and decreasing population; 28.6% of the population was over the age of 65 in July 2015 and the population has decreased by 2.6% from the 806,000 measured in the October 2010 national census.

Culture 
 Ichijōdani Asakura Family Historic Ruins is one of the most important cultural heritage sites in Japan.
 Eihei-ji is a temple offering training and education to Buddhist monks. Founded by Dogen Zenji in 1244, Eiheiji is located on a plot of land covering about 33 hectares.
 Myōtsū-ji's Three-storied Pagoda and Main Hall are National Treasures of Japan.
 Fukui is home to Maruoka Castle, the oldest standing castle in Japan. It was built in 1576.
 Many dinosaur fossils have been excavated in Fukui and they can be seen at the Fukui Prefectural Dinosaur Museum.
 Residents of Fukui Prefecture have a distinctive accent, Fukui-ben.
 Fukui has long been a center for papermaking in Japan (along with Kyoto). Its Echizen Papermaking Cooperative is a world-famous collection of papermakers making paper in the traditional Echizen style.
 Fukui is also renowned for its clean water and crops, which result in delicious sake, rice, and soba noodles.
 In August 2010 Fukui launched its own dating website entitled Fukui Marriage-Hunting Café in hopes of helping the declining population growth of Japan increase. Couples who meet in the site and continue on to marry receive monetary aid from the government as well as gifts.

Friendship cities 
 Vihti, Finland
 Winsen (Luhe), Germany

Education

University 
Fukui University
Fukui University of Technology
Fukui Prefectural University
Jin-ai University

Transportation

Railroad 
JR West
Hokuriku Line
Obama Line
Kuzuryu Line
Echizen Railway
Katsuyama-Eiheiji Line
Mikuni-Awara Line
Fukui Railway
Fukubu Line

Road

Expressway and Toll Road 
Hokuriku Expressway
Maizuru-Wakasa Expressway
Chubu Jukan Expressway
Mikata Lake Rainbow Road
Mount Hoonji Toll Road

National Highway 
 Route 8
 Route 27
 Route 157
 Route 158
 Route 161
 Route 162
 Route 303
 Route 305
 Route 364
 Route 365
 Route 367
 Route 416
 Route 417
 Route 418
 Route 476

Port 
Tsuruga Port - Ferry route to Niigata, Akita, Tomakomai, Otaru and International container hub
Fukui Port

Tourism 
 
 Ichijōdani Asakura Family Historic Ruins
 Eihei-ji Temple
 Tōjinbō, a scenic piece of coastline, which is also a notorious spot for suicide.
 Echizen crabs are a local delicacy available year-round, though the crabbing season is during the winter.
 Another traditional sea-side Fukui dish is genge, a small guppy-like fish that when eaten raw as sashimi, gives the body a brief tingling sensation.
 Awara is a famous onsen in the north of the prefecture.
 Takefu Chrysanthemum Character Doll Exhibition, held in Takefu Central Park on every October to November, first held on 1952.
Mikuni Festival, a combine portable shrine and floats traditional festival, every later May on every year, first held in 1697.

Notes

References
 Nussbaum, Louis-Frédéric and Käthe Roth. (2005).  Japan encyclopedia. Cambridge: Harvard University Press. ; OCLC 58053128

External links 

Official Fukui Prefecture homepage
Echizen Papermaking Cooperative 

 
Chūbu region
Prefectures of Japan
Hokuriku region